Yongji Station is a station on the Daegu Metro Line 3 in Beommul-dong, Suseong District, Daegu, South Korea.

Beommul Depot located across from Beommul Silver Welfare Center is connected by an elevated track section from Yongji Station.

Station layout

External links
 

Daegu Metro stations
Suseong District
Daegu Metro Line 3
Railway stations opened in 2015